A landslide dam or barrier lake is the natural damming of a river by some kind of landslide, such as a debris flow, rock avalanche or volcanic eruption. If the damming landslide is caused by an earthquake, it may also be called a quake lake. Some landslide dams are as high as the largest existing artificial dam.

Causes
The major causes for landslide dams investigated by 1986 are landslides from excessive precipitation and earthquakes, which account for 84%. Volcanic eruptions account for a further 7% of dams. Other causes of landslides account for the remaining 9%.

Consequences
The water impounded by a landslide dam may create a dam reservoir (lake) that may last for a short time, to several thousand years.

Because of their rather loose nature and absence of controlled spillway, landslide dams frequently fail catastrophically and lead to downstream flooding, often with high casualties. A common failure scenario is overflowing with subsequent dam breach and erosion by the overflow stream.

Landslide dams are responsible for two types of flooding: backflooding (upstream flooding) upon creation and downstream flooding upon failure. Compared with catastrophic downflooding, relative slow backflooding typically presents little life hazard, but property damage can be substantial.

While the dam is being filled, the surrounding groundwater level rises. The dam failure may trigger further catastrophic processes. As the water level rapidly drops, the uncompensated groundwater hydraulic pressure may initiate additional landslides. Those that fall into the dam reservoir may lead to further catastrophic spillages. Moreover, the resulting flood may undercut the sides of the river valley to further produce landslides downstream.

After forming, the dam leads to aggradation of the valley upstream, and dam failure leads to aggradation downstream.

Construction engineers responsible for design of artificial dams and other structures in river valleys must take into account the potential of such events leading to abrupt changes in river's regimen.

Examples
The highest known landslide dam of historic times is the Usoi Dam in modern Tajikistan created by a landslide triggered by an earthquake on February 18, 1911.
Between 1935 and 1950 the landslide was tunneled and sealed to stabilise it so it could be used for hydroelectric power generation. This appears to be the first example of modification of a natural landslide dam for power generation.
Attabad Lake in Pakistan was formed by a landslide in 2010. ( high)
The Red Lake (Romanian: Lacul Roşu) is a barrier lake in the Eastern Carpathians chain in Harghita County, Romania. The name of "Lacul Roşu" comes from the reddish alluvia deposited in the lake by the Red Creek. 
The Gros Ventre landslide is an example of a huge, short-lived and devastating landslide dam, ( high). 
The Lynmouth Flood of 15-16 August 1952 was partly the result of the formation and subsequent failure of a landslide dam on the East Lyn River, sending a wave of water and debris into the town and killing 34 people.
Quake Lake, created in Montana in 1959, ( high).
The Tangjiashan Lake, a dangerous "quake lake", was created as a result of the 2008 Sichuan earthquake. It was located in the extremely rugged terrain of Tangjiashan Mountain. Chinese engineers, scientists, and soldiers were involved in the digging of a sluice to alleviate the dangers of this one of 34 landslide dams created by the magnitude 8.0 Sichuan earthquake. On June 10, 2008, the lake started to drain via the sluice, flooding the evacuated town of Beichuan. ( high)
The Riñihuazo begun on 22 May 1960, after a landslide caused by the Great Chilean earthquake blocked Riñihue Lake's outflow. According to the chronicler Mariño de Lobera a similar event occurred after the 1575 Valdivia earthquake. ( high)
The 2014 Oso mudslide dammed the Stillaguamish River in March 2014, creating a lake that blocked Washington State Route 530 and hampered rescue/recovery efforts.
The largest landslide dam in Britain impounds Tal-y-llyn Lake (Llyn Mwyngil) beside Cadair Idris in Snowdonia National Park, Wales. It was first recognised by E Watson in 1962. It is probably over 10,000 years old.
Moklishko Ezero in North Macedonia
Trebenishko Ezero, near Trebenishta in North Macedonia
The 1139 Ganja earthquake triggered a massive landslide on Mount Kapaz, damming the Kürəkçay River, forming Lake Göygöl. The earthquake resulted in as many as 300,000 deaths.

References

Dams by type
Landslide analysis, prevention and mitigation